The  was a field gun used by the Imperial Japanese Army during the Second Sino-Japanese War and World War II. The Type 92 number was designated for the year the gun was accepted, 2592 in the Japanese imperial year calendar, or 1932 in the Gregorian calendar. The Type 92 cannon was intended to supersede the Type 14 10cm cannon in front-line combat service.

History and development
The Type 92 10 cm cannon was developed from 1923–1924, as a long range alternative to the Imperial Japanese Army's existing 75 mm field artillery. A suitable prototype was finally completed in 1932, and, after extensive testing, went into production and combat service in 1934. A total of 180 units were produced.

This piece appears to have almost completely replaced the Type 14 10 cm cannon. It has all the standard features of the 1930–1936 period of Japanese gun design. In traveling position the tube is retracted by means of a winch and locked to the cradle. The most remarkable fact about the Type 92, aside from its appearance, is the great range that it attains with a 35-pound shell in proportion to its unusually low weight. It has been reported that the weapon is rarely fired at extreme ranges, which require the use of a supercharge, because of malfunctions in the recoil system caused thereby. Some years ago troubles with the recoil system were so frequent that extra glands and packing for the recoil cylinders were carried in the firing battery, and replacing them was equivalent to first-echelon maintenance in U.S. practice. Difficulties were also reported when the weapon was fired at or near the limits of traverse. Whether this was due to a unique "bug" in the design of the Type 92 or was inherent in the use of spade-plate stabilization is not known. The Type 92 is stabilized by three spade plates for each trail. Both spade plates and trail blocks are demountable.

Design
Readily recognized by its long slender gun barrel and split carriage trail, the Type 92 10 cm cannon was designed particularly for long-range fire. The recoil system was hydro-pneumatic and it had a distinctive three-step interrupted thread breechblock.

The gun barrel was extremely long, making field transport very cumbersome. The gun was normally tractor-drawn using its large wooden wheels with solid rubber tires, but could also be pulled by a five-ton truck. Its greatest drawback was that it had spade plates on each trail leg that had to be pounded into the ground to anchor the gun in place.

Combat record
Despite design issues with transportability, the Type 92 10 cm cannon was very successful and was used for long-range counter-battery and bombardment roles. It was first used in combat with the IJA 7th Independent Heavy Field Artillery Regiment at the Battle of Nomonhan against the Soviet Red Army. It later was used in the Battle of the Philippines in 1942 during the assaults on Bataan and Corregidor Island, and it was transported to Guadalcanal and used in the bombardment of Henderson Field.

Surviving examples
A surviving gun is displayed in front of the Veterans Hall in Arcata, California. It has the serial number 136, and was made at the Osaka Infantry Armory.  

Another surviving gun is located in front of the Rome-Floyd Parks and Recreations center in Rome, Georgia. It has the serial number 33, and was made in Osaka, Japan. This gun, which is known as "Pistol Pete", was captured December 1942 at Guadalcanal. 

A third gun is located at The Istana, Singapore. It was presented to the leader of the returning victorious British forces to Singapore, Lord Louis Mountbatten, following the official Japanese surrender to the British in 1945 at the end of WWII.

Photo Gallery

References

Notes

Bibliography
 Bishop, Chris (eds) The Encyclopedia of Weapons of World War II. Barnes & Noble. 1998. 
 Chamberlain, Peter and Gander, Terry. Light and Medium Field Artillery. Macdonald and Jane's (1975). 
 Chant, Chris. Artillery of World War II, Zenith Press, 2001, 
 McLean, Donald B. Japanese Artillery; Weapons and Tactics. Wickenburg, Ariz.: Normount Technical Publications 1973. .
 Mayer, S.L. The Rise and Fall of Imperial Japan. The Military Press (1984) 
 War Department Special Series No 25 Japanese Field Artillery October 1944
 US Department of War, TM 30-480, Handbook on Japanese Military Forces, Louisiana State University Press, 1994. 
 Felter, Bob. "Arcata"s Cannon". Humboldt Historian, Winter 2012 Volume 60 Number 4

External links
 Type 92 on Taki's Imperial Japanese Army page
 US Technical Manual E 30-480

World War II field artillery
9
105 mm artillery
Military equipment introduced in the 1930s